Joseph Sterrett may refer to:

 Joseph Sterett (1773–1821), or Sterrett, Maryland militia officer
 Joseph Edmund Sterrett (1870–1934), American accountant